Disodium hydrogen phosphite is the name for inorganic compounds with the formula Na2HPO3.(H2O)x.  The commonly encountered salt is the pentahydrate. A derivative of phosphorous acid (HP(O)(OH)2), it contains the anion HPO32−. Its common name suggests that it contains an acidic hydrogen atom, as in sodium hydrogen carbonate. However, this name is misleading as the hydrogen atom is not acidic, being bonded to phosphorus rather than oxygen.  The salt has reducing properties.  It is white or colorless solid, and is little studied.

References

Phosphites
Inorganic phosphorus compounds
Sodium compounds